Nulato Airport  is a state-owned public-use airport located one nautical mile (2 km) northeast of the central business district of Nulato, a city in the Yukon-Koyukuk Census Area of the U.S. state of Alaska.

As per Federal Aviation Administration records, the airport had 2,917 passenger boardings (enplanements) in calendar year 2008, 2,833 enplanements in 2009, and 3,404 in 2010. It is included in the National Plan of Integrated Airport Systems for 2011–2015, which categorized it as a non-primary commercial service airport (between 2,500 and 10,000 enplanements per year).

Facilities 
Nulato Airport covers an area of 146 acres (59 ha) at an elevation of 399 feet (122 m) above mean sea level. It has one runway designated 2/20 with a gravel surface measuring 4,000 by 100 feet (1,219 x 30 m).

Airlines and destinations 

The following airlines offer scheduled passenger service at this airport:

Prior to its bankruptcy and cessation of all operations, Ravn Alaska served the airport from multiple locations.

Top destinations

References

External links 
 Topographic map from USGS The National Map
 FAA Alaska airport diagram  (GIF)
 

Airports in the Yukon–Koyukuk Census Area, Alaska